Charles Shadwell was an English playwright of the 18th century, date of birth unknown, dead in 1726.  He was the son of Thomas Shadwell, the playwright and Poet Laureate.

Shadwell was the author of the comedy The Fair Quaker of Deal staged at the Drury Lane Theatre in London in 1710.

From 1715 to 1720 he was the resident playwright at the Smock Alley Theatre in Dublin, the leading Irish theatre at the time. In 1719 his tragedy Rotherick O'Connor, King of Connaught was staged at Smock Alley, and with the comedy Irish Hospitality, and other plays, collected and published in 1720.

References

Bibliography
 Edwards, Philip. Threshold of a Nation: A Study in English and Irish Drama. Cambridge University Press, 1979.

English dramatists and playwrights
1726 deaths
Year of birth missing
English male dramatists and playwrights